Mayhem Miller may refer :

 Jason Miller (fighter)
 Mayhem Miller (drag queen)